Peter Chambers (born 14 March 1990) is a British rower, and is the brother of fellow rower Richard Chambers. He is a World Champion in the men's lightweight double sculls and an Olympic silver medalist in the men's lightweight coxless four.
He is also a great coach at Marlow rowing club and is leading them to victory.

Career 
Peter began rowing in Coleraine, Northern Ireland for Bann Rowing Club.

His first international medal came in 2009, when he and won the bronze medal in the men's lightweight quadruple sculls at the Under-23 World Championships.  In 2010, he won the silver medal in the men's lightweight single sculls at the Under-23 World Championship.  in 2011, he finally stood on the top step of an Under-23 World Championship podium, winning the men's lightweight double sculls with Kieren Emery.

That year, Chambers and Emery also won the senior men's lightweight double sculls World Championship.

At the 2012 Summer Olympics in London he was part of the British crew that won the silver medal in the lightweight men's four, alongside his brother Richard, Rob Williams and Chris Bartley.

At the 2013 World Championship, he won bronze with his brother in the men's lightweight double sculls.

In 2014, Chambers won silver at the European Championship and bronze at the World Championship in the men's lightweight four.

He was the 2015 European Champion in the lightweight men's pair, along with Joel Cassells, who also started his rowing career at Bann Rowing Club.

In 2016, he won European silver in the men's lightweight four, and was selected for the British Olympic team competing in the men's lightweight coxless four event with Chris Bartley, Mark Aldred and Jono Clegg, finishing in seventh place.

In 2017 at the 2017 World Rowing Championships he won a silver in the lightweight quadruple sculls.

References

External links
 Peter Chambers at British Rowing
 
 
 

1990 births
Living people
British male rowers
People from Ballymoney
Rowers at the 2012 Summer Olympics
Rowers at the 2016 Summer Olympics
Olympic rowers of Great Britain
Olympic silver medallists for Great Britain
Olympic medalists in rowing
Medalists at the 2012 Summer Olympics
Sportspeople from County Antrim
Alumni of Oxford Brookes University
World Rowing Championships medalists for Great Britain
Rowers from Northern Ireland
European Rowing Championships medalists